Brandon O'Neil Scott is an American actor and producer. He is best known for his roles as Ryan Spalding in the medical drama series Grey's Anatomy (2008–2009), Kohut in the animated comedy film Wreck-It Ralph (2012), Henry in the action-adventure game The Last of Us (2013), Alex in the animated drama series Penn Zero: Part-Time Hero (2015–2017), Jameson in the action-adventure game Uncharted 4: A Thief's End (2016), Coach J.J. Kerba in the teen drama series 13 Reasons Why (2019–2020), Nick Prager in the dark comedy series Dead to Me (2019–present), and Cory Lawrence in the romantic drama series This Is Us (2019).

Early life and education
Brandon O'Neil Scott was born in Tuscaloosa, Alabama, the youngest of three children. He attended Central High School and later earned a BFA in acting from New York University's Tisch School of the Arts.

Career
Scott began his acting career with a minor role in the 2005 short film Water, and went on to have guest roles on television series such as Law & Order, NCIS: Los Angeles, CSI: NY, Masters of Sex, Bones, and Cold Case. In 2012, he appeared in the films Knife Fight and Stand Up Guys and voiced Kohut in the Disney animated comedy film Wreck-It Ralph. In 2013, he voiced and provided the motion capture of Henry in the action-adventure game The Last of Us, which became arguably his most notable role. He enjoyed portraying Henry, particularly due to the fact that he was allowed to introduce elements of his own personality, and stated that "you don't have to plan [the little nuances] because you get to just be the character". He also felt that recording the voice and motion capture simultaneously was exciting and helpful.

From 2008 to 2009, Scott played Ryan Spalding in the ABC medical drama series Grey's Anatomy for 15 episodes. In 2016, he provided the voice and motion capture of Jameson in the action-adventure game Uncharted 4: A Thief's End and played Peter in the horror film Blair Witch. In 2018, he joined the cast of Channel Zero as Officer Luke Vanczyk for six episodes in the third season. The same year, he played Tom Hodgson for six episodes in the fourth and final season of the show. In 2019, he played Cory Lawrence in the NBC romantic drama series This is Us, as well as Officer Nick Prager in the Netflix dark comedy series Dead to Me. From 2019 to 2020, he appeared as Coach J.J. Kerba in the Netflix teen drama series 13 Reasons Why.

In 2021, Scott is set to join the main cast in the fourth and final season of the Amazon Prime Video legal drama series Goliath.

Personal life
Scott began dating Jenn Liu in 2014, and they were married in 2017.

Filmography

Film

Television

Video games

References

External links
 
 
 

Living people
African-American male actors
American male film actors
American male television actors
American male voice actors
Male actors from Alabama
People from Tuscaloosa, Alabama
Tisch School of the Arts alumni
21st-century African-American people
21st-century American male actors
Year of birth missing (living people)